Matija Radović (born April 25, 1998) is a Serbian professional basketball player for Slodes SoccerBet of the Basketball League of Serbia. He played college basketball for the Hofstra Pride and the American International Yellow Jackets.

Early career 
Radović started to play basketball for the Crvena zvezda youth system. Radović played in the 2015–16 season Finals of Euroleague NGT where he recorded 18 points. In July 2016, he had moved to the United States, to Montverde Academy in Montverde, Florida where he played as a senior.

College career 
In June 2017, the Hofstra Pride added Radović to their roster. As a freshman, Radović appeared in 25 games at the Hofstra Pride in their 2017–18 season. In the freshman season, he averaged 2.2 points and 1.8 rebounds per game. In 2019, Radović moved to the American International Yellow Jackets for his junior season.

Professional career 
In August 2020, Radović signed for Mladost Zemun.

International career 
Radović was a member of the Serbia national U16 team that played at the 2014 FIBA Europe Under-16 Championship. Over nine tournament games, he averaged 7.0 points, 3.7 rebounds and 1.8 assists per game.

References

External links 
 Profile at eurobasket.com
 Profile at realgm.com

1998 births
Living people
American International Yellow Jackets men's basketball players
Basketball League of Serbia players
Basketball players from Belgrade
Hofstra Pride men's basketball players
KK Crvena zvezda youth players
KK Mladost Zemun players
KK Slodes players
Serbian expatriate basketball people in the United States
Serbian men's basketball players
Small forwards
Sportspeople from Pančevo
Montverde Academy alumni